Kumar is a title, a given name, middle name or a family name native to South Asia (mainly India and Nepal and to a lesser extent Sri Lanka).

Kumar may also refer to:
 Kumar (title)
 Kumar (name), a given name and surname (and list of people with the name)
 Kumar (Singaporean entertainer), Singaporean cross-dressing performer
 Kumar (musician) (born 1984), Cuban rapper
 Kumar (magazine), Gujarati language magazine

Geography
 Kumar Barilya, a pair of cities in Bangladesh
 Kumar (Jammu and Kashmir), a town in India
 Kumar Bandi, a town in Pakistan
 Jabal Kumar, a mountain in Iraq
 Gir-e Kumar, a mountain in Iraq

See also 
 Kumari (disambiguation), the female form of the name